Doubt (Original Arabic title الشك) is a British-Lebanese-Saudi psychological thriller television series created by Nasri Atallah, Firas Abou Fakher and Daniel Habib as a Shahid Original for MBC Group. It premiered on June 13, 2020.

The 10-episode series was conceived, produced and released within a two-month period at the during the first coronavirus lockdown, and relied heavily on remote filming techniques.

Premise
Samar is isolated in her family's old house during lockdown. Mistakenly, she logs into the wrong video chat and witnesses a murder. The mysterious killer turns her life into a living hell, forcing her to fight for her life and face the demons of her past.

Cast

 Fatima Al-Banawi as Samar
 Kosai Khauli as Malek, Samar's ex-husband
 Baraa Alem as Houssam, Samar's co-worker
 Razane Jammal as Iman, the therapist
 Nadia Malaika as Dima, Samar's sister

Production
Doubt was commissioned from Last Floor Productions a Shahid Original for MBC Group’s Shahid streaming platform, the largest in the Middle East. Filming took place between Beirut, Jeddah and London. Due to it being conceived and shot at the peak of the first coronavirus lockdown, teams working remotely over video conference and many actors filming themselves with improvised set-ups in their own homes.

Release date
Doubt was released on 13 June 2020 on Shahid.

References

External links
 

Psychological thriller television series
2020 television series debuts
Saudi Arabian television series
Arabic-language television shows
2020 British television series debuts
2020 British television series endings
21st-century Lebanese television series debuts